The men's 4 × 100 metres relay event at the 1982 Commonwealth Games was held on 8 and 9 October at the QE II Stadium in Brisbane, Australia.

Medalists

Results

Heats
Qualification: First 4 teams of each heat (Q) plus the next 1 fastest (q) qualified for the final.

Final

References

Final results (The Sydney Morning Herald)
Heats results (The Canberra Times)
Final results (The Canberra Times)
Australian results 

Athletics at the 1982 Commonwealth Games
1982